The Cloggies, an Everyday Saga in the Life of Clog Dancing Folk, was a long-running cartoon by Bill Tidy that ran in the satirical magazine Private Eye from 1967 to 1981, and later in The Listener from 1985 to 1986. It gently satirised northern English male culture, and introduced a shocked nation to the scurrilous delights of Lancashire clog-dancing.  This particular variation of the art involved two teams dancing towards each other in formation, followed by each attempting to cripple their opponents with gracefully executed knee and foot moves.  Thus the Forward Sir Percy, a synchronized low-level knee attack, the Double Arkwright wi' Ankle Lever, the Heckmondwycke with Reverse Spin and the ever controversial Triple Arkwright. Other routines included the Half Arkwright with Groin Action, the Erotic Elbow Drive and the match-winning Flying Arkwright, performed to cries of, “Keep them knees stylish!”

The team
The Cloggies were undisputed champions of their ‘sport’, usually inflicting severe clog dance-related injuries on their opponents before repairing to the nearest pub.  Their capacity for beer was legendary; their home venue, the Clog & Bells, Blagdon, where Doris the barmaid was always in a welcoming mood. There were also unorthodox activities involving the use of ferrets.

The series lampooned contemporary British sports culture and introduced an entire sub-culture of fictitious dance leagues, a governing body for the sport of clog dancing (characterised as officious, bureaucratic, blazer-wearing, out-of-touch and based on the Football Association), an idiosyncratic cast of sociopaths and a yearning for earlier, gentler days of greater respect (such as the famous Policeman on a White Bicycle). As a reflection of the officious nature of league officials and umpires (who always seem to have it in for The Cloggies) the scoring system was deeply arcane and complex, with final scores such as 124.863 to 92 being recorded.

The team consisted of:
 Stan Postlethwaite (captain), later ennobled as Lord Stan of Blagdon
 Albert Postlethwaite (second boot, with his false teeth)
 Neville (third boot; trilby and glasses) (or Wilfrid, trilby, glasses and moustache)
 Arnold (fourth boot)
 Ted (fifth boot, with the grey socks)
 Wally (sixth boot, later deceased, replaced by Norman).
 Norman (bearded).

Other unsavoury local residents included Reginald ('Reg') Thrumper, the "Blagdon Amateur Rapist" and the unnamed 'Blagdon Groper and Nuisance'.

Origin

The sub-title, an Everyday Saga in the Life of Clog Dancing Folk, parodied the subtitle to the long-running BBC radio series, The Archers, which was subtitled an Everyday Story of Country Folk. 
Three retrospective collections of the cartoons were published between 1969 and 1977, with titles The Cloggies (1969), The Cloggies Dance Again (1973) and The Cloggies Are Back (1977).

Bill Tidy's inspiration for this series may have grown out of one of his cartoons in Punch in the mid 1960s, where he parodied the funding objectives and credibility of the Arts Council of Great Britain by illustrating a group of morris dancers in full costume gathered around a table outside a pub, on which is an enormous pile of empty beer glasses, with one of them asking "Well lads, what are we going to do wi' rest of Arts Council grant ?"

Final triumph 
In one series of cartoons, the Cloggies were selected to represent Great Britain in the 1966 International Folk Dance Festival, beating the USSR in the final despite Wally’s double hernia, and returned victorious to Blagdon with the Gold Boot of Strichtenstein. They were persuaded to turn professional by their new manager, Morris ‘Zip’ Fassner (later Shufflebottom) and embarked on a world tour before once more returning to the Clog & Bells and rejoining their local league. Their opponents included The Bull & Veterinary Surgeon, The Rat & Goldfish, The Horse & Shovel, The Truss & Slagheap, The Fox & Pervert (a sly swipe at a current scandal and court case involving a leading artistocratic fox hunter with a penchant for sado-masochism), The Grunting Duck and Gridley’s Soap Works. In 1966, a strip showed the Cloggies winning the United Kingdom Drunk and Disorderly Shield.

The Cloggies of University Hall, Buckland

Inspiration

Although other dancers have more recently appropriated the name, The Cloggies originally took on a real life of their own in 1968 when a group of students at University Hall, Buckland in Oxfordshire, became so inspired by the cartoon characters’ pub-oriented career that they formed their own squad. Photographs from the period show the team in the following order:  Stan (Pete Metcalfe), Wally (Gwyn Ellis), Neville (John Barton), Arnold (Iain Murray), Ted (Andy Carr) and Albert (Al Guyver). The shady-looking character is the manager, Morris (Mike Fernie). Arthur (Nigel Brewis), was later named as reserve boot in case of injury or hangover. Bill Tidy personally wrote to the team to officially endorse and encourage them, delighted that “all those years spent labouring on Spam have produced a debased art form”.

Live performances 

The Cloggies performed uninvited and to mixed receptions at several college discos, offering terrifying moves such as The Forward Lunge with Curse, but their big breakthrough came when asked by producer Martin Pennock to take on the country-dancing roles in the closing scenes of John Milton’s  Comus . Buckland was the smallest ever college (120 students) to enter the Sunday Times / NUS Drama competition. The preliminary round took place at Lord Faringdon’s private theatre, whose stage was just wide enough to accommodate six Cloggies dancing abreast. As the play was about to start, the lights failed so everyone settled in the pub until the power-cut ended. The adjudicator seemed much more enthusiastic two hours and several pints later, but there was a serious delay in getting the Cloggies from the bar and back on stage. Their performance was hampered by a spread of fruit and milk underfoot from the previous orgy scene and most spectators felt it was a disaster.

Final triumph 
Buckland was one of eight chosen from sixty universities and colleges to travel to Southampton University for the Student Drama Festival Finals in the winter of 1970/71. After sitting through several other productions, the audience went wild when the Cloggies hit the stage at the end of Comus. The Southern Arts Review praised the ‘boisterous rustic dancing Cloggies’, while French radio covered the event, describing them as “un groupe de danseurs folkloriques” and playing a recording of them dancing to the strains of Fairport Convention’s Lark in the Morning – the boots, the bells, the yells.  Nicholas de Jongh, drama correspondent of The Guardian, wrote that the play was ‘… degraded into a cheap grotesque pantomime’, adding that, ‘the late appearance from the dancing Cloggies underlined the cheapness of the conception.’ This was seen by the lads as a complete vindication of all they had stood for.

The team’s swansong was as dancing shepherds in the British premiere of the medieval French fable Aucassin and Nicolette, translated by Alex Kerr and produced by Pennock in the college grounds on 27 June 1971. The use of a full beer crate as a prop did not interfere with the narrative.

References

External links
Bill Tidy

1967 comics debuts
1986 comics endings
Comics characters introduced in 1967
Fictional dancers
Satirical comics
Humor comics
British comic strips
Comics set in the United Kingdom
Works about dance
Culture in Lancashire
British comics characters